Enis Behiç Koryürek, (born 11 March 1891, Istanbul - 18 October 1949, Ankara), was a Turkish poet, teacher, diplomat and bureaucrat.

He is a diplomat who has made great contributions to the development of Turkish-Hungarian friendship and turning Gül Baba Tomb into a museum again. He was one of the first bureaucrats who approached the workers' issues seriously and opened the ways of institutionalization for solutions.

Biography 
He was born in 1891 in the Aksaray district of Istanbul. His father is Doctor Lieutenant Colonel İsmail Behiç Bey and his mother is Fâika Hanım.

After completing his primary education at home, he studied at Thessaloniki and Skopje High Schools and Istanbul High School and graduated from the Mülkiye Mektebi with first place in 1913. He published his first poem, titled "My Soul Embeds in My Poems" when he was 19 years old. He took part in the Fecr-i Ati community for a short time. He had wide repercussions with his poem "Vatan Elegy", which he dedicated to "Namik Kemal's soul".

Bibliography 
Poems

 Miras (1927)
 Varidat-ı Süleyman (Çedikçi Süleyman Çelebi Ruhundan İlhamlar, 1949)
 Güneşin Ölümü (1952)

References 

 

1891 births
1949 deaths
Writers from Istanbul
Diplomats from Istanbul